I Hate Being Single is an American comedy web series created and written by American director Rob Michael Hugel and funded by Kickstarter.  The series is broadcast on the internet and premiered on Blip on January 1, 2012. So far, two seasons have been created. I Hate Being Single surrounds the life of Rob, a 20-something who struggles to find his place in the confusing world of friends, relationships, parties, and dating in Brooklyn. The cast is made up of NYC comedians from the Upright Citizens Brigade.

History 

I Hate Being Single was written by Rob Michael Hugel, and was inspired by his first few months living in New York and pursuing an acting career. Rob was also inspired by working as the director and editor of  the web series 'Broad City'.  In an interview, he mentions what it was like living in New York and where some of the ideas for I Hate Being Single came from: "Being new to town, getting over a breakup, trying to make friends or find my footing socially was full of ups and downs." Rob wanted to make a web series that was as close to his personal experiences as possible as a starting point. Rob states that 90 percent of the show is based on his own life . 
 
The series won 'Bing Audience Choice Award Winner' at the  2011 New York Television Festival. I Hate Being Single is in the Official Selection at the International Film Festival Rotterdam 2013 and the Official Selection and nominee in five categories at the Indie Soap Awards 2013 including Best Writing Comedy and Best Director.

Episodes

Season 1: 2012

Season 2: 2015

Rob's Room

Season 1: 2012
Episode 1: Dom Complains - Rob cleans his room while Dom complains. 
Episode 2: Celebrity Impressions - Rob and Dom enjoy ramen and try out some impressions.
Episode 3: Memory Lane - Rob and Shannon hang out in Rob's room and Rob takes several trips down memory lane.
Episode 4: Puppet Playtime - Rob and Shannon hang out in Rob's room and Rob introduces Shannon to his puppet friends. 
Episode 5: Home Workout - Dom shows Rob how to work out from home.
Episode 6: Sodastream - Rob and Shannon enjoy fresh seltzer from a Sodastream.

Season 2: 2013
Episode 1: Nap Time - Rob takes a nap whilst his friend is over. 
Episode 2: You Over-Instagram - Shannon drops the news on Rob that he over-Instagrams. 
Episode 3: You Don't Watch Homeland? - Rob is distressed that his friend doesn't watch the TV series Homeland. 
Episode 4: It'll Take a Second  - Rob is trying to use the high tech stuff to watch a viral cat video. 
Episode 5: Drama - Dom and Rob have drama.
Episode 6: I Have Psoriasis - Shannon e-diagnoses herself with psoriasis via WebMD.
Episode 7: Look, I'm a Hipster! - Rob gets a phone call and Dom is left alone in the room to snoop. The transformation is quick.

References

External links 
 Official website 
 I Hate Being Single on Blip

2012 web series debuts
American comedy web series
Kickstarter-funded web series